Westside Township may refer to one of the following places in the United States:

 Westside Township, Nobles County, Minnesota
 Westside Township, Phelps County, Nebraska

See also
West Side Township, Crawford County, Iowa
Westside (disambiguation)
West Township (disambiguation)

Township name disambiguation pages